The Magari language, Magra ki Boli, is a variety of Bhil in India. Ethnologue lumps it under Bhil proper.

References 

Languages of India